is a Japanese former cyclist. He competed in the individual road race at the 1992 Summer Olympics. As a professional, he rode for Bridgestone Racing, the precursor of Bridgestone–Anchor, until he retired in 2000. He then became an employee of Bridgestone Cycle.

References

External links
 

1967 births
Living people
Japanese male cyclists
Olympic cyclists of Japan
Cyclists at the 1992 Summer Olympics
Sportspeople from Iwate Prefecture
Cyclists at the 1998 Asian Games